Kandanur is a panchayat town in Karaikudi taluk, Sivaganga district in the Indian state of Tamil Nadu. The town is famous for Kandanur Sivan Kovil, which is a replica to the Madurai meenatchi amman temple built by Nagarathars community. Kandanur Perumal temple is equally popular in the area. Also, near by town Puduvayal is famous for its Veerasekara Umaiyambigai Temple (Sakkottai area). Palaniappan Chidambaram is an Indian politician and former attorney who currently serves as Member of Parliament, Rajya Sabha and formerly served as the Union Minister of Finance of India is from Kandanur

Demographics
 India census, Kandanur had a population of 6454. Males constitute 49% of the population and females 51%. Kandanur has an average literacy rate of 69%, higher than the national average of 59.5%: male literacy is 76%, and female literacy is 63%. In Kandanur, 12% of the population is under 6 years of age.

Notable people

 P.Chidambaram, Former Union Minister of Finance India and Union Home Minister of India.

References

Cities and towns in Sivaganga district